William Stratford Percy (1872–1946) was an Australian stage comedian who also appeared in a number of short films.

He made his reputation appearing in productions for J. C. Williamson Ltd. He co-starred in "The Girls of Gottenburg" and "The Dairymaids" with Reginald Roberts, Fanny Dango and George Lauri in Melbourne.

Percy left Australia in 1913 and appeared in a number of shows in the USA before heading to England.

Although he returned to Australia in the early 1920s to tour, he based the rest of his career in England.

In the late 1930s he started writing travel books.

Select credits
All for Gold, or Jumping the Claim (1911) – original story
Percy Gets a Job (1912) – short film
Maid of Athens (1914) – Broadway show
Percy's First Holiday (1914) – short film
A Cold Doucho – theatre show
Joyland – London Hippodrome
Hijinks – tour over Briain
Oh, Don't, Dolly (1919) – London Criterian
The Girl for the Boy
Medore 
Babes of the Wood (1922) – Australian pantomime
Strolling Through Scotland (1934) -- book
Strolling Through England (1935) – book
Strolling through cottage England (1936) – book

References

External links

Australian male comedians
Australian male film actors
Australian male stage actors
Australian travel writers
1872 births
1946 deaths